Ballynahinch may refer to:

Northern Ireland
Ballynahinch, County Armagh, a townland
Ballynahinch, County Down, a town

Republic of Ireland
Ballynahinch (barony), in County Galway
Ballynahinch, County Galway, a townland in County Galway
Ballynahinch, County Longford, a townland in Cashel civil parish, barony of Rathcline
Ballynahinch, County Offaly, a townland in Kilcumreragh civil parish, barony of Kilcoursey
Ballynahinch, County Tipperary, a townland in County Tipperary